The 1992–93 Ohio Bobcats men's basketball team represented Ohio University in the college basketball season of 1992–93. The team was coached by Larry Hunter and played their home games at the Convocation Center. They finished the season 14–13 and finished fourth in the MAC regular season with a conference record of 11–7.  Gary Trent was named MAC Player of the year.

Roster

Schedule

|-
!colspan=9 style=|Non-conference regular season

|-
!colspan=12 style=| MAC regular season

|-
!colspan=9 style=| MAC Tournament

Source:

Statistics

Team Statistics
Final 1992–93 Statistics

Source

Player statistics

Source

Awards and honors
Gary Trent – MAC Player of the Year

References

General
Final 1993 Division I Men's Basketball Statistics Report
Ohio Record Book

Ohio Bobcats men's basketball seasons
Ohio
Bob
Bob